Stephen L. Harris (February 5, 1937 - April 14, 2019) was Professor of Humanities and Religious Studies at California State University, Sacramento. He served there ten years as department chair and was named a Woodrow Wilson Fellow. He received his MA and PhD degrees from Cornell University. Harris was a member of the American Academy of Religion, a fellow at the Westar Institute, a fellow of the controversial Jesus Seminar, and authored several books on religion, some of which are used in introductory university courses.

He also had a strong interest in some geological topics. Harris grew up in western Washington state where the views of Mount Rainier and the mentoring of his grandfather inspired a lifelong interest in the eruptive potential of the volcanoes in the Cascade Mountain range, about which he became a widely known authority.

Harris taught an adult education class on "Evolving Concepts of God" at St. Mark's Methodist Church, Sacramento, using his text, The Old Testament: An Introduction to the Hebrew Bible.

He died of cancer in Sacramento at the age of 82.

Publications
 
 
 
 
 
 
 
 
 
 Restless Earth.(National Geographic Books)

References

1937 births
2019 deaths
American biblical scholars
California State University, Sacramento faculty
Cornell University alumni
People from Washington (state)
Members of the Jesus Seminar
American United Methodists
People from Aberdeen, Washington